Roger de La Fresnaye (11 July 1885 – 27 November 1925) was a French Cubist painter.

Early years and education
La Fresnaye was born in Le Mans where his father, an officer in the French army, was temporarily stationed. The La Fresnayes were an aristocratic family whose ancestral home, the Château de La Fresnaye, is in Falaise. His education was classically based, and was followed from 1903 to 1904 by studies at the Académie Julian in Paris, and from 1904 to 1908 at the École des Beaux-Arts. From 1908 he studied at the Académie Ranson under Maurice Denis and Paul Sérusier, whose joint influence is evident in early works such as Woman with Chrysanthemums, 1909. This demonstrates the dreamlike symbolist ambience and stylistic character of work by the Les Nabis group. In 1909, Fresnaye travelled to Munich, where he encountered the German Expressionists, and then, in 1911, to northern Italy where he began to introduce more cuboid and abstract elements into his own painting.

Career
From 1912 to 1914 La Fresnaye was a member of the Section d'Or group of artists, and his work demonstrates an individual response to cubism. He was influenced by Georges Braque and Pablo Picasso, but his work has a more decorative than structural feel and his prismatic colours reflect the influence of Robert Delaunay. He was a member of the Puteaux Group, an orphist offshoot of cubism led by Jacques Villon. His most famous work is The Conquest of the Air, 1913, which depicts himself and his brother outdoors with a balloon in the background.

La Fresnaye enlisted in the French army in World War I but contracted tuberculosis and was discharged in 1918. His health deteriorated rapidly after the war. He never recovered the physical energy to undertake sustained work. In the later paintings that he did create, he abandoned cubist spatial analysis for a more linear style. He ceased painting in 1922 but continued to draw. De la Fresnaye died in Grasse in 1925 at the age of 40.

Art market
On March 24, 2017, a new record was established for a work by De la Frensaye at auction when "La conquête de l'air, avec deux personnages" sold for €2,370,500 at Christie's in Paris.

Gallery

References

Further reading
Germain Seligman: Roger de La Fresnaye, Thames & Hudson Ltd (1969) 
Tom  Slevin: '"The Catastrophe of my Existence": Facing Death in Roger de La Fresnaye's Self-Portraiture' (Angelaki: Journal of Theoretical Humanities, Vol. 16 No.1, 2011)
 Niccolo Caldararo on research concerning the paintings by de la Fresnaye, especially one owned by George de Batz, "The Mysterious Case of an Art Collector Extraordinary Found by Examination of a Painting," e_conservation, the online magazine, No. 4, April 2008, pp. 52–68/94.

External links

 Artcyclopedia - Links to Fresnaye's works
 

1885 births
1925 deaths
19th-century French painters
French male painters
Académie Julian alumni
20th-century French painters
20th-century French male artists
Cubist artists
Orphism (art)
Art educators
19th-century French male artists